Aphelia cinerarialis is a species of moth of the family Tortricidae. It is found in Beijing, China.

References

Moths described in 1992
Aphelia (moth)
Moths of Asia